Samsun Atatürk Anatolian High School is an Anatolian High School, educating in its historical building which is established in Samsun city, Turkey.

Education
Its education is based on Anatolian High School System, and it is one of the most selective High-Schools in Blacksea coast of Turkey, and the most selective Anatolian High School in Samsun. (According to the High-School Entrance Exam Statistics (1)) Educating language is Turkish. English and German are compulsory foreign languages.

Due to the Turkish Education System in 10th grade of school, students select one of the three sections, which are "Foreign Language Based", "Maths-Science Based" and "Turkish-Maths Based". Although the hours of each courses change in this sections, students are responsible all of the main courses like Maths, Turkish, Physics, History etc.
Also students can take courses like Drawing, Music, Computer Science, PE etc.

Building and Laborities

School has got Physics, Chemistry, Biology and Computer Science Laboratories; also Music, Drawing and Foreign Languages rooms.

History

Before Republic

In the last quarter of the 19th century, Ottoman Empire, which was trying to reform its Educational System, did several enterprises to French  Education Ministry, after all of these enterprises and the success of Galatasaray Sultanisi (which was founded in the control of the French educator M.Savier), Ottoman decided to open Sultanis in every region.

Because of these decisions, Samsun Atatürk Anatolian High School opened with the name "Samsun Sultanisi" as the first and the only Sultani in Samsun.

In 1914 it has served as a military hospital, and on 14 March 1919 with the occupation of Samsun by English forces, its building has been used as Headquarters of (Samsun) English Occupation Forces.

After Republic
After 1923 the school building is used as Orphans' House. In 1927 the school opened as High-School again and named Samsun Lisesi (Samsun High-School).

On 26 October 1930, the school is visited by M.Kemal Atatürk, and he said one of the most famous quotes of him there,
"Teachers, we set up the Republic but you are the ones who will cause it to rise and make it live. Republic wants you generations which have free mind, free conscience, free knowledge and high character.The real lighter in life is Science."

In 1998 it became an Anatolian High School and took the name "Ataturk Anatolian High School".

References

 School's Official Web-Site (In Turkish)
 High-Schools Entrance Exam Statistics (In Turkish)

Atatürk
Education in Samsun
Buildings and structures in Samsun Province
Educational institutions established in 1998
1998 establishments in Turkey
Things named after Mustafa Kemal Atatürk
Anatolian High Schools